Abijah C. Jay House is a historic home located at Marion, Grant County, Indiana.  It was built in 1888, and is a two-story, Queen Anne style brick dwelling. It has a compound slate hipped roof with gables and wraparound front porch.

It was listed on the National Register of Historic Places in 2003.

References

Marion, Indiana
Houses on the National Register of Historic Places in Indiana
Queen Anne architecture in Indiana
Houses completed in 1888
Buildings and structures in Grant County, Indiana
National Register of Historic Places in Grant County, Indiana
1888 establishments in Indiana